American Indian Wars are the numerous armed conflicts between European empires or colonists, and later by the American and Canadian settlers or American and Canadian governments, and the indigenous peoples of North America. These conflicts occurred across the country beginning with the Tiguex War in 1540 within present-day New Mexico and ending with the Renegade period during the Apache Wars in 1924 within the Southwestern United States.

According to a dataset of conflicts between Native American communities and colonial powers, the frequency of conflict increases dramatically in both Mexico and the United States during the second half of the 19th century.

16th century wars

17th century wars

18th century wars

19th century wars

20th century wars

See also

 List of historical Indian reservations in the United States
 List of Indian massacres
 List of traditional territories of the indigenous peoples of North America
 U.S.–Native American treaties
 Population history of indigenous peoples of the Americas
 Territorial evolution of the United States
 Territorial evolution of Canada
 Numbered Treaties

References

Colonization history of the United States
Demographic history by country or region
Ethnic cleansing in the Americas
History of indigenous peoples of North America
Indigenous peoples of North America
Military history of the United States
Military history of Canada
Native American history
Native American-related lists